Cixiinae is a planthopper subfamily in the family Cixiidae. It is one of three such subfamilies, the other two being the Bothriocerinae and the Borystheninae. While a few species had been tested in a larger study of the Fulgoroidea, neither the Cixiinae nor its tribes were analysed cladistically until 2002. Resolution of tribal relationships is incomplete and additional testing of the tribes with samples larger than one per tribe is needed.

Tribes 
In 1938 Metcalf divided the Cixiinae into tribes, including the Cixiini and Oecleini of Muir; however, those divisions were seldom referred to and remained unanlaysed for decades. Subsequently, the Stenophlepsiini were returned to the Cixiinae, and the Pentastirini were subdivided into the Pentastirina and Oliarina subtribes. However, Oliarina was later synonymized under Pentastirina.  In 2002, Emeljanov created seven new tribes and in 2004 subtribe Mnemosynina of tribe Pentastirini was raised to tribal level as the Mnemosynini.

Currently there are sixteen recognized tribes, although some tribes lack adequate description:

 Andini Emeljanov, 2002
 Bennarellini Emeljanov, 1989
 Bennini Metcalf, 1938
 Brixidiini Emeljanov, 2002
 Brixiini Emeljanov, 2002
 Cajetini Emeljanov, 2002
 Cixiini Muir, 1923 - non-monophyletic
 Duiliini Emeljanov, 2002
 Eucarpiini Emeljanov, 2002 -  monophyletic
 Gelastocephalini Emeljanov, 2000 - putatively monophyletic
 Mnemosynini Szwedo, 2004 - one extant genus Mnemosyne (planthopper) Stål, 1866 (5 extinct)
 Oecleini Muir, 1922 - non-monophyletic
 Pentastirini Emeljanov, 1971 -  monophyletic
 Pintaliini Metcalf, 1938 - non-monophyletic
 Semonini Emeljanov, 2002 - putatively monophyletic
 Stenophlepsiini Metcalf, 1938

References

External links